Ashcombe House or Ashcombe Park may refer to several places in England:

Ashcombe House, East Sussex
Ashcombe House, Somerset, formerly occupied by Peter Gabriel
Ashcombe House, Wiltshire, occupied by Guy Ritchie, and previously by Sir Cecil Beaton, and Madonna
Ashcombe Park, Staffordshire, country house and estate in Staffordshire
Ashcombe Park, district and public park in Weston-super-Mare, Somerset